Sky Ranch Airport , also known as Sky Ranch Estates or Aérodrome de Sky Ranch, is a privately owned, public use airport located two nautical miles (4 km) southwest of the central business district of Sandy Valley, a town in Clark County, Nevada, United States.

Facilities and aircraft 
Sky Ranch Airport covers an area of 158 acres (64 ha) at an elevation of 2,599 feet (792 m) above mean sea level. It has two runways: 3/21 is 3,340 by 45 feet (1,018 x 14 m) with an asphalt surface and 12/30 is 3,300 by 105 feet (1,006 x 32 m) with a dirt surface.

For the 12-month period ending January 31, 2011, the airport had 3,000 general aviation aircraft operations, an average of 250 per month. At that time there were 71 aircraft based at this airport: 83% single-engine, 9% multi-engine, 4% ultralight, 3% helicopter, and 1% jet.

See also 
 List of airports in Nevada

References

External links 
  from Nevada DOT
 Aerial image as of May 1994 from USGS The National Map
 
 
 AirportIQ info for 3L2, including Homeowner Association contact

Airports in Clark County, Nevada